Talmine is a town and commune in Charouine District, Adrar Province, in south-central Algeria. According to the 2008 census it has a population of 12,768, up from 9,469 in 1998, with an annual growth rate of 3.1%.

Geography

It covers the westernmost oases in the Gourara region of northern Adrar Province (excepting the villages of Meslila and Bent Cherk that lies in Béchar Province. The oases mainly lie in the southernmost part of the Grand Erg Occidental, a large area of sand dunes stretching well into Béchar and El Bayadh provinces.

Climate

Talmine has a hot desert climate (Köppen climate classification BWh), with extremely hot summers and mild winters, and very little precipitation throughout the year.

Transportation

The main road through the commune is a provincial road that starts at the village of Taghouzi, passes through Taguenout, Saguia and Boukezzine before connecting to the N6 national highway southeast of Ksabi. A number of local roads connect this main road to the villages of the commune.

Education

1.0% of the population has a tertiary education (the second lowest in the commune), and another 3.2% has completed secondary education. The overall literacy rate is 36.4% (the second lowest in Adrar Province), and is 56.2% among males (second lowest in the province) and 15.0% among females (lowest in the province).

Localities
As of 1984, the commune was composed of 11 localities:

Boukezine
Talmine
Saguia
Guettouf
Takialt
Taghouzi
Naama
Taarabien
Tamesguelout
Timarine
Yahia Oudriss
Bahammou
Zaïtar
Rached
Taguenout
Guellou

References 

Neighbouring towns and cities

Communes of Adrar Province
Cities in Algeria
Algeria